The following is the list of lakes in Georgia, the country in the Caucasus. The Georgian word for "lake" is tba.

Largest lakes

Other 

Lisi Lake
Turtle Lake (Tbilisi)

References 

Georgia
Lakes